Stony Island is a 1978 American musical drama film directed by Andrew Davis. It concerns an up-and-coming rhythm and blues band in Chicago. Set in various places in Chicago, including gritty Stony Island Avenue, it stars Richard Davis, the director's brother, and features early appearances from Dennis Franz and Rae Dawn Chong as well as numerous local musicians including saxophone great Gene Barge. Susanna Hoffs, whose mother co-wrote the screenplay, also appears. Future director Mark Romanek worked as one of the cameramen.

The film was well received by critics, who praised its music and the depiction of contemporary Chicago. However, the film was not a commercial success.

Cast 
 Richard Davis as Richie Bloom 
 Edward "Stony" Robinson as  	Kevin Tucker 
 Gene Barge as  Percy Price
 George Englund Jr. as  Harold Tate 
 Nathan Davis as  Lewis Moss
 Oscar Brown as  Alderman Waller 
 Ronnie Barron as  Ronnie Roosevelt
 Tennyson Stephens as  Tennyson
 Windy Barnes as  Windy
 Rae Dawn Chong as  Janetta
 Criss Johnson as  Criss
 Dennis Franz as  Jerry Domino
 Susanna Hoffs as  Lucie 
 Meshach Taylor as   Aldeman's Yes-Man

Home media
The film was released on DVD in 2012.

References

External links
 Stony Island movie

1978 films
Films directed by Andrew Davis
1978 directorial debut films
1970s English-language films
American musical drama films
1970s American films